Here We Come A-Caroling is a 1965 album by Ray Conniff. It was recorded in Los Angeles, California from July 21–23, 1965. The album peaked at #15 on Billboards Best Bets For Christmas album chart on December 3, 1966.  In the late 1960s, the album was reissued with the title Ray Conniff's Christmas Album: Here We Come A-Caroling''''' and featured a new album cover.

Track listing

References

Ray Conniff albums
1965 Christmas albums
Christmas albums by American artists
Columbia Records Christmas albums
Pop Christmas albums